Koputaroa, Koputāroa or Kōputaroa is a rural community in the Horowhenua District and Manawatū-Whanganui region of New Zealand's North Island.

It is located south of Shannon and north of Levin on State Highway 57. It had a railway station from 1886 to 1986.

The New Zealand Ministry for Culture and Heritage gives a translation of "long snare for catching parakeets" for Kōputaroa.

Marae

The local Kererū Marae and Mahinārangi meeting house are a meeting place of the Ngāti Raukawa hapū of Ngāti Takihiku and Ngāti Ngārongo.

In October 2020, the Government committed $335,056 from the Provincial Growth Fund to upgrade Kikopiri Marae and Kererū Marae, creating 48 jobs.

Education

Koputaroa School is a co-educational state primary school for Year 1 to 8 students, established in 1891.

References

Populated places in Manawatū-Whanganui
Horowhenua District